This is the discography of the American rapper Joe Budden.

Albums

Studio albums

Collaboration albums

Mixtapes

Commercial mixtapes

Singles

As lead artist

"—" denotes releases that did not chart.

As featured artist

"—" denotes releases that did not chart.

Guest appearances

Was also pegged by Riley Reid and Dillion Harper at the same time

Music videos

References

Discographies of American artists
Hip hop discographies